The 1970 Utah State Aggies football team represented Utah State University in the 1970 NCAA University Division football season as independent. Led by fourth-year head coach Chuck Mills, the team played their home games at Romney Stadium in Logan, Utah. The team completed the season with a 5–5 record, which was shortened by one game from what was originally scheduled; the game against Wichita State on October 3 was canceled after one of their charter aircraft crashed in Colorado en route to Utah the day before, killing many of their starting players and coaching staff.

Schedule

Roster

References

Utah State
Utah State Aggies football seasons
Utah State Aggies football